The Royal Commission on London Traffic was a Royal commission established in 1903 with a remit to review and report on how transport systems should be developed for London and the surrounding area. It produced a report in eight volumes published in 1905 and made recommendations on the character, administration and routing of traffic in London.

Establishment
The Royal Commission on London Traffic was established on 10 February 1903. It had 13 commissioners and was chaired by Sir David Barbour. Its secretary was Lynden Macassey and the other commissioners were:

Earl Cawdor, Chairman of the Great Western Railway
Viscount Cobham
Baron Ribblesdale
Sir Joseph Dimsdale MP, member of parliament for the City of London and former Lord Mayor of London
Sir Robert Reid MP, former Attorney General
Sir John Dickson-Poynder MP, member of the London County Council

Sir John Wolfe Barry, former President of the Institution of Civil Engineers
Sir Francis Hopwood, Permanent Secretary to the Board of Trade
Sir George Trout Bartley MP, member of parliament for Islington North
Charles Murdoch, Assistant Under Secretary at the Home Department
Felix Schuster, Banker
George Gibb, General Manager of the North Eastern Railway

Remit
The Commission's remit was to report on London's traffic arrangements and:
(a) as to measures which the Commission deem most effectual for the improvement of the same by the development and inter-connexion of Railways and Tramways on, or below, the surface; by increasing the facilities for other forms of mechanical locomotion; by better provision for the organization and regulation of vehicular and pedestrian traffic, or otherwise;
(b) as to the desirability of establishing some authority or tribunal to which all schemes of Railway or Tramway construction of a local character should be referred, and the powers which it could be advisable to confer on such a body.

In its report the Commission described this as "Greater London" and the urban developed area at its centre as "the Metropolis". The area beyond the Metropolis was described as "Extra London".

Investigation
The Commission held 112 meetings and interviewed 134 witnesses. Members of the Commission carried out fact-finding visits to New York, Boston, Philadelphia and Washington in 1903 and to Vienna, Budapest, Prague, Cologne, Dresden, Berlin, Brussels and Paris in 1904.

An Advisory Board of three engineers was appointed to give the Commission technical advice. The board consisted of Sir John Wolfe Barry (also a member of the Commission), Sir Benjamin Baker, former President of the Institution of Civil Engineers, and William Barclay Parsons, Chief Engineer to the Board of Rapid Transit Railroad Commissioners of the City of New York.

Report and recommendations
The Commission's Report, Report of the Royal Commission Appointed to Inquire Into and Report Upon the Means of Locomotion and Transport in London, was published in eight volumes on 17 July 1905.

The Report examined the historic development of road, rail and tram transportation and the current condition. It made recommendations for improvements to roads within London's central area and arterial roads; for improvements in tramways including new routes and for improvements in railways of all types including their connections to one another. Recommendations were made as on road traffic regulations and the Commission recommended the establishment of a Traffic Board to manage traffic developments in the Greater London area and carry out preliminary reviews of bills for traffic schemes before they were submitted to parliament.

Roads
The Report identified that road traffic was constrained by the narrowness of many of London's roads which reflected the historic development of the city.

The Report recommended that a comprehensive plan should be developed to improve road provision and routing to be carried out over the long term and that new roads should be constructed to standard widths depending on their importance and that existing main routes should be widened when possible.

Recommended road improvements

The Advisory Board recommended construction of two "Main Avenues". The Main Avenues would connect areas on the outskirts of the main urban area and tramways and railway lines would be connected to these at both ends:

A: New Main Avenue, West to East – Bayswater Road to Whitechapel running from Victoria Gate of Hyde Park, through Portman Square, Russell Square, London Wall to the junction of Commercial Road and Whitechapel High Street.
B: New Main Avenue, North to South – Holloway to Elephant & Castle running via Caledonian Road and Gray's Inn Road and including a new bridge over the River Thames to the west of Blackfriars Bridge.

The Main Avenues would cross at Gray's Inn Road. Definitive routes were not proposed, but the Report recognised that the scale of the projects would require them to be carried out as a complete exercise.

Other main road improvements recommended by the Advisory Board were:
C: Widening of Marylebone Road and Euston Road.
D: Construction of a new street between Marylebone Road and Edgware Road.
E: Extension of The Mall to Charing Cross (now the north end of Whitehall).
F: Widening of Constitution Hill.
G: Widening of Princes Street, Westminster and construction of a new street along the east side of St James's Park to Waterloo Place and Duke of York's Column.
H: Widening of Broad Sanctuary, Westminster.
I: Widening of Uxbridge Road and Bayswater Road.
J: Widening of Hammersmith Road and Kensington Road.
K: Widening of Fulham Road and Brompton Road.
L: Widening of King's Road, Chelsea.
M: Extension of West Cromwell Road.
N: Widening of King Street, Hammersmith.
O: Widening of Wandsworth Road, Lavender Hill, St John's Hill and Wandsworth High Street from Lambeth to Putney.
P: Widening of Brentford High Street or construction of a new street.
Q: Viaduct from Blackfriars Bridge to Farringdon Street. The viaduct would start in the centre of the bridge and run to just south of Holborn Viaduct to relieve congestion at the north end of the bridge and at Ludgate Circus.
R: Viaduct from Waterloo Bridge to Wellington Street to segregate traffic from the bridge from east-west traffic along Strand.
S: Construction of a new street from Berkeley Square to the Mall via the eastern side of Green Park with branches to connect to Jermyn Street and Pall Mall.
T: Widening Marble Arch between Edgware Road and Park Lane.

The Report indicated that there were many other roads and junctions that required improvements including for main roads leading out of London. For the latter the Report recommended that this should be a responsibility for the Traffic Board to report on when established. Although it did not make any recommendations on the subjects, the Report noted that submissions made to the Commission, included suggestions for "making roads in different directions out of London", "constructing a circular road about 75 miles in length at a radius of 12 miles from St Paul's", "providing alternative streets parallel to crowded thoroughfares, and new streets" and "removing factories from London".

Tramways
The Report identified that the existing tramway systems were fragmented and lacked connections. Compared to other British cities, Greater London's tramway systems were significantly under-developed. The report criticised the London County Council's (LCC's) policy of refusing to allow the privately owned tramways operating outside the county's boundary to connect to and operate over its municipally owned system within. It also criticised the failure of the County to join its three separate systems together and to allow trams in the central areas of the City of London and the West End.

The Report recommended that interconnection of the existing tramways be undertaken and recommended construction of many new routes in areas not served and that through running of services between different operators be allowed. The Report recommended that vetoes held by the London County Council and the municipal boroughs within it over the construction of new tramways should be abolished.

The Advisory Board recommended the construction of 23 new tramways to connect the separate systems and bring trams to unserved areas. It estimated that the cost of constructing double line tramways was four to five per cent of the cost of constructing a cut and cover line such as the Metropolitan Railway or 13 to 17 per cent of the cost of a deep-level tube line such as the Central London Railway.

Recommended tramway improvements

The new routes recommended by the Advisory Board were:
 Route 1: Across Hammersmith Bridge – to connect the London County Council Tramways' ('s) planned terminus at the north end to the London United Tramways' (LUT's) terminus at the south end.
 Route 2: Hammersmith to Knightsbridge – Hammersmith Broadway running via Hammersmith Road, Kensington Road and Knightsbridge to the north end of Sloane Street.
 Route 3: Knightsbridge to Aldgate – continuing Route 2 and running below ground in a subway from the junction of Albert Gate and Knightsbridge via Hyde Park Corner, Piccadilly, Coventry Street, Leicester Square, King William Street, Strand, Fleet Street, Ludgate Hill, Cheapside, Cornhill, Leadenhall Street to the 's terminus in Aldgate High Street.
 Route 4: Fulham and Brompton Road – running from a junction with the 's planned terminus in Fulham Palace Road and Fulham High Street via Fulham Road and Brompton Road and ending at a junction with Routes 2 and 3 at the north end of Sloane Street.
 Route 5: Grosvenor Place and Hyde Park – running from the 's terminus in Vauxhall Bridge Road via Victoria Street, Grosvenor Gardens, Grosvenor Place and Hyde Park to the southern end of Edgware Road. The section from Grosvenor Gardens to Edgware Road would run in a subway, part of which was to be under Hyde Park.
 Route 6: Edgware Road and Maida Vale – running from a junction with Route 5 at Marble Arch via Edgware Road, Maida Vale, Kilburn High Road to a junction with the Middlesex County Council's Light Railways' terminus at Cricklewood.
 Route 7: Harrow Road –  running from a junction with the Harrow Road and Paddington Tramways' (HR&PT's) terminus in Harrow Road via Harrrow Road, Westbourne Terrace and Bishops Road to a junction with Routes 6 and 22 in Edgware Road.
 Route 8: Cambridge Avenue – running from a junction with the 's terminus in Cambridge Road via Cambridge Avenue to a junction with Route 6 in Edgware Road.
 Route 9: Uxbridge Road and Bayswater Road – running from the 's terminus in Uxbridge Road at Shepherd's Bush via the Holland Park Avenue, Notting Hill Gate and Bayswater Road to connect to Route 5 at Marble Arch.
 Route 10: Westminster Bridge and Victoria Embankment – running from the 's terminus in Westminster Bridge Road via Westminster Bridge, Victoria Embankment to a junction with the 's planned Kingsway tramway subway and Route 11 at the north end of Waterloo Bridge.
 Route 11: Waterloo Bridge and Blackfriars Bridge – running from a junction with Route 10 at the north end of Waterloo Bridge via the Victoria Embankment to a junction with Routes 12 and 13 at the north end of Blackfriars Bridge.
 Route 12: Queen Victoria Street and Southwark Bridge – running from a junction with Route 11 at the north end of Blackfriars Bridge via Queen Victoria Street, Cannon Street, Queen Street and Southwark Bridge to the 's terminus in Southwark Bridge Road.
 Route 13: New Bridge Street and Farringdon Street – running from the 's terminus in Blackfriars Road across Blackfriars Bridge and then on a viaduct above New Bridge Street to Farringdon Street, Farringdon Road and Clerkenwell Road to a junction with the 's terminus in Theobald's Road 
 Route 14: Holborn and Charterhouse Street – running from a junction with the 's terminus at the southern end of Gray's Inn Road via Holborn, Holborn Circus and Charterhouse Street to a junction with Route 13 in Farringdon Road.
 Route 15: York Road, Stamford Street and Southwark Street – running from a junction with the 's terminus in Westminster Bridge Road via York Road, Stamford Street and Southwark Road to a junction with the 's terminus in Southwark Bridge Road. A branch along Waterloo Road would connect with the 's terminus there.
 Route 16: Tower Subway – running from a junction with the 's terminus at Leman Street then in a tunnel under the River Thames on the east side of St Katharine Docks to a junction with the 's terminus at the south end of Tower Bridge.
 Route 17: Tottenham Court Road and Whitehall – running from a junction with the 's terminus at the southern end of Hampstead Road via Tottenham Court Road, Charing Cross Road, the east side of Trafalgar Square, Charing Cross, Whitehall, Parliament Street and Bridge Street to a junction with Route 10 at the west end of Westminster Bridge.
 Route 18: Moorgate, Liverpool Street and Norton Folgate – running from a junction with the 's terminus at South Place via Finsbury Pavement, Finsbury Circus, Liverpool Street and Bishopsgate to a junction with the 's terminus in Norton Folgate.
 Route 19: Aldersgate Street to Post Office – running from a junction with the 's terminus near Charterhouse Square and then in a subway under Aldersgate Street and St. Martin's Le Grand to a terminus near the General Post Office.
 Route 20: King's Road, Chelsea and Buckingham Palace Road – running from a junction with the 's terminus in Fulham High Street at the north end of Putney Bridge via New King's Road, King's Road, Sloane Square, Lower Sloane Street, Pimlico Road and Buckingham Palace Road to a junction with Route 4 at the junction of Victoria Street and Grosvenor Gardens.
 Route 21: Victoria Street, Westminster – running from a junction with Route 5 at the north end of Vauxhall Bridge Road via Victoria Street, Broad Sanctuary and Parliament Square to a junction with Route 17 in Parliament Street.
 Route 22: Marylebone Road and Euston Road – running from a junction with Route 7 at Edgware Road via a proposed new road, Marylebone Road, Euston Road to a junction with the 's terminus at King's Cross station.
 Route 23: Finchley Road – running from a junction with Route 22 at Upper Baker Street via Park Road, Wellington Road and Finchley Road to a junction with the Middlesex County Council's Light Railways' planned terminus at Childs Hill.

With the exception of Route 8 and the southern end of Route 1 and the northern parts of Routes 6 and 23 which crossed the county boundary, all of the routes were in the County of London.

Railways

The Report noted that the Commission considered that the purpose of railways was to bring passengers from the residential districts into the urban centre. A survey of traffic usage calculated the estimated total number of journeys for 1903 as 310,662,501 (27,364,209 from the west, 51,838,742 from the north, 89,224,298 from the east, 75,487,731 from the south-east and 66,717,521 from the south-west).

Within the urban centre, trams and buses were considered to be the most convenient form of mass transport. The Commission excluded railway goods traffic from its consideration noting only that the distribution of most retail goods within the centre on London was by road as the railways could not compete due to convenience and cost. A desire was expressed that this was better organised to reduce its contribution on traffic congestion, but no solution was proposed.

The Report noted that most suburban and long distance passengers arrived at the same termini and that government policy of prohibiting railways from entering central London meant that the many railway companies then in operation had developed a messy network of lines in the periphery to connect to one another. The Report noted that the Commission considered the way in which the termini had been located around the central area and the way that the railway companies' lines had been connected to one another were the main causes of deficiencies in the railways.

The Commission set itself three questions with regard to the provision of railways: were additional railways needed in the London area and should they be deep-level, sub-surface or surface lines; were the existing suburban rail services sufficient and was special encouragement or assistance needed for future railway construction.

Recommended railway improvements
The Report noted that deep-level underground lines under construction (Baker Street and Waterloo Railway, Charing Cross, Euston and Hampstead Railway and Great Northern, Piccadilly and Brompton Railway) or planned would provide additional connections with many of the termini not already connected which would facilitate passengers' onward journeys into the central area. It considered that these new lines would mitigate many of the existing problems, but recommended that connections between north-south and east-west lines be provided and that connections between the suburban networks on the east and west sides of the central area be improved including by way of the Main Avenues proposed for the road and tram improvements. The only new deep-level line recommended was from Victoria station northwards to alleviate what was expected to remain a problem for passengers travelling into the central area. The Report recommended that a north-south line be provided from Victoria to Marble Arch where the approved but unbuilt North West London Railway was to terminate.

To improve east-west connections, the Advisory Board recommended connecting Hammersmith to the City of London via Kensington, Piccadilly and the Strand either by an underground railway or as a tramway (Routes 2 and 3 above).

The other main recommendation was that construction of railways in London should continue to be funded by private enterprise, but that parliament should provide a favourable system of procedures to encourage bills to be promoted as easily as possible. The commission also recommended that parliament should avoid imposing additional financial burdens on the proposals, such as the cost of reconstructing roads and should allow railway companies to buy land around their proposed new extensions in order to benefit from the increase in land prices and to profit from the new services they provide.

Traffic Board
The Report identified the need for a unified system for the "general control of measures affecting locomotion and transport in London", but considered it inappropriate for any of the existing authorities within the region to fulfil this role or for it to be established as a committee composed of representatives of the multiple authorities. It, therefore, recommended that a new authority, a "Traffic Board", be established. The Report recommended that the board partially replace the existing parliamentary process of scrutinising private bills for transport proposals in the Greater London area. The Report's recommendation was that the board should have the powers for:
 Control of traffic
 Regulation of the opening up of streets
 Removal of obstructions to traffic
 Provision of new railway lines and tramways
 Monitoring of road maintenance by local authorities and identification of failures
 Preliminary examination and reporting on of private bills before submission to Parliament
 Hold annual sessions and produce an annual report but be generally in continuous operation

With regards to the construction of new transport systems, The Report considered that the Traffic Board might function in a similar supervisory capacity to the Rapid Transit Railroad Commissioners of New York or the Rapid Transit Commission of Boston.

The Report recommended that The Traffic Board should have a chairman and two to three other members. Because of the small number of members, The Report considered nomination by the local authorities within the Greater London area to be inappropriate as not all would be represented. Therefore the board's members should be directly appointed by the government.

The costs of the board should be covered by a fees and a levy on the local authorities within the Greater London area paid from the local rates.

Minority reports
Two of the Commission's members issued their own reports; a third member issued an additional recommendation. Bartley felt that the main report did not go far enough in its recommendations and he wanted the full adoption of the Advisory Board's recommendation for the construction of a pair of grand avenues. Dimsdale, rejected the main report's recommendation for tram routes in central London. Gibb's additional recommendation was that part of the route of the then under construction Great Northern, Piccadilly & Brompton Railway should be merged with a planned route from the Central London Railway to form a looping line.

Afterwards
The Report's recommendations were acted on in a limited manner. The recommendation for an all-encompassing Traffic Board was not adopted, although the London and Home Counties Traffic Advisory Committee was established in 1924 to oversee road traffic in the London Traffic Area.

Amongst the recommendations for road improvements, the new east-west and north-south Main Avenues were not constructed. A number of the proposed road improvements were carried out:
 Marylebone Road was extended west to a new junction with Edgware Road in the 1960s in conjunction with the construction of the Marylebone Flyover and the Westway
 The Mall was extended to Charing Cross in 1912 when Admiralty Arch was constructed
 The western end of Constitution Hill was rearranged when Hyde Park Corner was replanned in the 1960s for the Hyde Park Underpass
 The extension of West Cromwell Road and widening of King Street, Hammersmith were dealt with in the 1960s by the construction of the new A4 road starting at West Cromwell Road, including widening of Talgarth Road and construction of the Hammersmith Flyover
 The widening or replacement of Brentford High Street was dealt with in the 1920s by the construction of the Great West Road starting at Chiswick
 Instead of a viaduct from Waterloo Bridge to Wellington Street the disused Kingsway tramway subway was converted in 1964 to the Strand Underpass connecting northbound traffic from Waterloo Bridge to Kingsway
 Marble Arch was widened in the 1960s when Park Lane was widened

The tramway system was gradually improved into a more integrated system. By the mid-1910s, the three independent tram companies were owned by the London and Suburban Traction Company which was jointly owned by the Underground Electric Railways Company of London (UERL) and British Electric Traction.

Review and approval of all new railway lines or extensions to existing lines continued to be carried out by parliament. From 1913, the  also controlled the Central London Railway and the City and South London Railway. Extensions of all of the lines were proposed and built during the 1910s to 1930s. From 1910, the  also owned the largest bus company in London, the London General Omnibus Company.

Consolidation of the mainline railway companies continued and under the Railways Act 1921 they were merged into the Big Four in 1923.

Further studies that considered the improvement of traffic in London were carried out. Sir Charles Bressey with Sir Edwin Lutyens considered road improvements in The Highway Development Survey (1938) and Sir Patrick Abercrombie's County of London Plan (1943) and Greater London Plan (1944) included recommendations on rail and road transport.

See also

Royal Commission on Metropolitan Railway Termini
London Ringways

Notes and references

Notes

References

Bibliography

 
 
 

Organizations established in 1903
Organizations disestablished in 1905
British Royal Commissions
History of transport in London
Proposed transport infrastructure in London